Bashkim Muhedini (born 3 January 1949) is an Albanian retired football player. He was a goalkeeper for Partizani Tirana and the Albania national team in the 1970s.

Club career
Just like the famous Albanian sculptor Odhise Paskali, Muhedine hails from the village Kozarë. He played basketball in school, but Bejkush Birçe persuaded him to play football and he subsequently joined the Partizani academy led by Birçe. He replaced Mikel Janku as Partizani's first choice goalkeeper, but he was forced to quit his career due to political reasons in 1976.

International career
He made his debut for Albania in a June 1971 European Championship qualification match away against West Germany and earned a total of 7 caps, scoring no goals. His final international was a November 1973  friendly match against China.

Personal life
Muhedini was a son-in-law of Albanian general Beqir Balluku, who was executed during the Hoxha regime. Family of Balluku were persecuted and Muhedini was forced to retire from playing for being a relative as well and he was 'relocated' and became a physical education teacher. In 1979 he was allowed to leave for Përmet and coached the local team. Nowadays he lives in New York.

Honours
Albanian Superliga: 1
 1971

References

External links

1949 births
Living people
People from Berat County
Association football goalkeepers
Albanian footballers
Albania international footballers
FK Partizani Tirana players
Kategoria Superiore players
Albanian football managers